Țuică (sometimes spelled tuica, tzuika, tsuika, tsuica, or tzuica) is a traditional Romanian spirit that contains ~ 24–86%  alcohol by volume (usually 40–55%), prepared only from plums. Other spirits that are produced from other fruit or from a cereal grain are called "rachiu" or "rachie". Țuică is also the foundational element for creating the traditional romanian cognac from different spirited fruits coffee flavored. In 2013, Romania produced  of țuică.

Preparation

Traditionally, țuică is prepared from early October until early December (after winemaking is complete). The plums must be left for fermentation (macerare) for 6–8 weeks, in large barrels (butoaie or căldări or putini).

According to both tradition and Romanian standards (SR), distillation must be done in a copper still (cazan, pictures at ), using a traditional fire source (generally wood, but also charcoal).

The temperature is controlled traditionally by interpreting the sounds that the still makes and by tasting the brew at different points in the process. Usually, this process results in two grades of țuică:

normal: distilled once, the last to come from the still; between 24–40% alcohol.
very strong: distilled twice, generally a quarter of the production, and the first to come out of the still; about 50–65% alcohol by volume, stronger than palinka; called pălincă de prune, fățată, întoarsă, or horincă depending on the region; the most famous țuică served before a meal; in rural regions, it is customary to serve this drink to a guest.

After distillation, țuică may be left to age between six months and ten years in mulberry aging barrels (the result is pearlescent yellow, has a strong aroma, and is known as "old țuică", țuică bătrână), or it may be consumed immediately ("fresh țuică", țuică proaspătă). The people preparing țuică are sometimes referred to as țuicari, căzănari, or cazangii, but this varies according to geographical region. Mixed with water, țuică should never turn white or opaque.

Types
Țuică is prepared using traditional methods both for private consumption and for sale. Although this was illegal in the past, the government tolerated the practice due to the traditional character of the beverage. Some communities have acquired production licences and produce it legally.

The generic term "țuică" comprises plum brandies (horincă, cocârț, tura). A specific nomenclature was created for țuică, comprising varieties such as old, selected, superior, etc.

A commercial famous presentation is "țuică cu fruct". This is a glass bottle of țuică containing a whole plum fruit. It is obtained by hanging empty bottles on trees in spring or early summer and growing the fruit inside the bottle.

Consumption
Normally, țuica is only consumed before the meal (traditionally every meal). In most cases, only a shot-sized amount is served, and it is generally sipped. The drink is also present in all traditional parties (agape) such as weddings, baptisms, hunting parties, harvest festivals, religious holidays, family reunions, and wakes. In most of rural Romania, țuică is the usual drink to hold a toast with, rather than wine. Usually it is drunk before a meal, as it increases appetite.

A modern portrayal of a modern village inhabitant almost always includes a bottle of țuică. For rural families producing țuică for their own consumption (not commercial) the output can amount between ~ 10 - 200 litres per family per year, as the plum tree is the most widely present tree in Romanian orchards (see also Agriculture in Romania). Țuică is sometimes used as part of a small remuneration package for small work or "daily work" (non contract based or between friends). 

Romania is the largest plum producer in the European Union and among the top plum producers in the world.

See also
Pálinka
Raki (alcoholic beverage)
Rakia
Slivovitz

References

External links

  — ORDIN nr. 368 din 13 iunie 2008 pentru aprobarea Normelor privind definirea, descrierea, prezentarea şi etichetarea băuturilor româneşti (Official Romanian legislation for defining, describing and labelling of Romanian traditional spirits.

Fruit brandies
Distilled drinks
Plum spirits
Romanian distilled drinks
Moldovan alcoholic drinks